Amélie Rivat-Mas (née Rivat; born 14 November 1989) is a French retired racing cyclist. She finished second in the French National Road Race Championships in 2010, 2013, and 2017.

Major results

2010
 2nd Road race, National Road Championships
2011
 2nd Road race, National Under-23 Road Championships
 4th Road race, UEC European Under-23 Road Championships
2013
 2nd Road race, National Road Championships
 5th Road race, Jeux de la Francophonie
2014
 6th Overall Tour Cycliste Féminin International de l'Ardèche
 8th Grand Prix de Plumelec-Morbihan Dames
 9th Cholet Pays de Loire Dames
2015
 2nd Cholet Pays de Loire Dames
 3rd Road race, National Road Championships
 8th La Classique Morbihan
 9th Grand Prix de Plumelec-Morbihan Dames
 10th Overall Tour de Bretagne Féminin
1st Mountains classification
2016
 3rd La Classique Morbihan
 8th Grand Prix de Plumelec-Morbihan Dames
 10th Overall La Route de France
2017
 2nd Road race, National Road Championships

References

External links

1989 births
Living people
French female cyclists
Cyclists from Lyon